Pak Se-ri or Se-ri Pak (born 28 September 1977) is a South Korean former professional golfer who played on the LPGA Tour from 1998 to 2016. She was inducted into the World Golf Hall of Fame in 2007.

Career overview
Born in Daejeon, she attended Yuseong Elementary School in that city and then Keumseong Girls’ High School in Gongju City, Chungnam Province, where she was the school's best amateur golfer. She then moved to Seoul for training. 
Pak turned professional in 1996, a year before she moved to the United States as a 20-year-old. In 1996 and 1997, she won six tournaments on the LPGA of Korea Tour. Pak joined the LPGA Tour full-time for the year 1998, crowning her rookie season with victories in two majors: the McDonald's LPGA Championship and U.S. Women's Open. At just 20 years of age, she became the youngest-ever winner of the U.S. Women's Open. About.com writes that "Pak won a 20-hole playoff for that victory, making that tournament - at 92 holes in length - the longest tournament ever in women's professional golf." Four days after the U.S. Women's Open win, Pak shot a then-LPGA record 61 during the second round of the Jamie Farr Kroger Classic. She won the Rolex Rookie of the Year award for that season.

Since 1998, she has gone on to win 21 more events on the Tour, including three more majors. In June 2007, at age 29, she qualified for the World Golf Hall of Fame, surpassing Karrie Webb as the youngest living entrant ever. (Tom Morris, Jr., who died in 1875 at the age of 24, had been elected in 1975.)

Pak has also competed in a professional men's event, at the 2003 SBS Super Tournament on the Korean Tour. The Korean Tour was a feeder tour for the Asian Tour and did not offer world ranking points. She finished 10th in the event, according to the World Golf Hall of Fame "becoming the first woman to make the cut in a professional men's tournament since Babe Zaharias did so in 1945."

At the 2005 McDonald's LPGA Championship, she missed the cut for the first time in 29 majors. In an interview quoted on the PGA Tour's website, she commented that she was searching for a balance between her golf and her personal life: "I've been a little bit unhappy about everything, my game, big game. I'm not really enjoying it at all, and I'm not doing anything with my ability. I know what I needed, a much better balance. I'm always putting a lot of pressure on myself". Eventually, she was found to have a finger injury. In 2006, she rediscovered her best form by winning the McDonald's LPGA Championship for the third time to claim her fifth major title overall.

In 2007, she won the Jamie Farr Owens Corning Classic for the fifth time, making her the fourth player in LPGA history to win the same tournament five or more times (Annika Sörenstam accomplished this feat at two tournaments).

Perhaps the greatest tribute to her career to date came in a column by Golf World writer Eric Adelson in 2008, who called Pak "a pioneer... who changed the face of golf even more than Tiger Woods." When Pak came to the LPGA in 1998, she was the only Korean player. Ten years later, she was one of 45 Koreans on tour, and the single largest source of revenue for the LPGA was the sale of TV rights in South Korea.

Pak was the only South Korean on the LPGA Tour in the year 1998. Her spectacular triumph at the 1998 U.S. Women's Open encouraged many Korean women to take up golf as a sport. She is regarded as a leader of the game in her home country and has also inspired the new generations of LPGA players Na Yeon Choi and Inbee Park who have followed her footsteps at the LPGA level. A statue of her now stands outside Gongju's stadium. This statue commemorates her signature moment: a successful shot from a water hazard to remain tied for first place in the 1998 U.S. Women's Open; this allowed her to force a sudden death playoff which she then won with "a tremendous birdie putt from nearly 20 feet on the second hole." This was a victory named by the Korea Times as the 3rd most acclaimed moment in 60 years of South Korean sports history. Her shot was shown as the basis for the first episode of the Korean TV drama "Birdie Buddy."

On 17 March 2016, Pak announced that she would retire following the 2016 season. She retired the following 13 October, after completing the first round of her country's lone LPGA-sanctioned event, the LPGA KEB Hana Bank Championship.

Professional wins (39)

LPGA Tour (25)

LPGA Tour playoff record (6–0)

LPGA of Korea Tour (14)

Major championships

Wins (5)

1 Defeated Chuasiriporn on the second hole of a sudden-death playoff, after an 18-hole playoff round 
2 Defeated Webb on the first hole of a sudden-death playoff

Results timeline
Results not in chronological order before 2015.

^ The Women's British Open replaced the du Maurier Classic as an LPGA major in 2001
^^ The Evian Championship was added as a major in 2013

CUT = missed the half-way cut
WD = withdrew
"T" = tied for place

Summary

Most consecutive cuts made – 29 (1997 U.S. Open – 2005 Kraft Nabisco)
Longest streak of top-10s – 5 (2001 U.S. Open – 2002 U.S. Open)

LPGA Tour career summary

official through 2016 season

World ranking
Position in Women's World Golf Rankings at the end of each calendar year.

Team appearances
Amateur
Espirito Santo Trophy (representing South Korea): 1994

Professional
Lexus Cup (representing Asia team): 2006 (winners), 2007 (winners), 2008

Filmography

Television shows

Web shows

Awards and nominations

See also

List of female golfers
List of golfers with most LPGA Tour wins
List of golfers with most LPGA major championship wins

References

External links

South Korean female golfers
LPGA Tour golfers
LPGA of Korea Tour golfers
Winners of LPGA major golf championships
World Golf Hall of Fame inductees
South Korean expatriate sportspeople in the United States
Sportspeople from Daejeon
South Korean Buddhists
1977 births
Living people